Besteiros may refer to:
 Besteiros Parish, Amares
 Besteiros Parish, Paredes
 Besteiros, Portugal - former city now part of Tondela:
 Barreiro de Besteiros
 Campo de Besteiros
 Santiago de Besteiros
 Vilar de Besteiros